Kirichenkovo is a rural locality (a selo) in Tkhorevskoye Rural Settlement, Kamensky District, Voronezh Oblast, Russia. The population was 218 as of 2010. There are 4 streets.

Geography 
Kirichenkovo is located 5 km southwest of Kamenka (the district's administrative centre) by road. Kamenka is the nearest rural locality.

References 

Rural localities in Kamensky District, Voronezh Oblast